The 1993 Volvo Tennis San Francisco was a men's  tennis tournament held at the San Francisco Civic Auditorium in San Francisco, California in the United States and was part of the World Series of the 1993 ATP Tour. The tournament was held from February 1 through February 7.  After 21 years it was the final time the tournament was held in San Francisco before switching location to San Jose. First-seeded Andre Agassi won the singles title and earned $39,600 first-prize money.

Finals

Singles

 Andre Agassi defeated  Brad Gilbert 6–2, 6–7(4–7), 6–2
 It was Agassi's 1st singles title of the year and the 18th of his career.

Doubles

 Scott Davis /  Jacco Eltingh defeated  Patrick McEnroe /  Jonathan Stark 6–1, 4–6, 7–5

References

External links
 ITF tournament edition details